NetForce is a 1999 American made-for-television science fiction action drama film directed by Robert Lieberman, written by Lionel Chetwynd, and starring Scott Bakula. Based on the Tom Clancy's Net Force series of novels created by Tom Clancy and Steve Pieczenik, it was broadcast on ABC in 1999.

Plot 
In 2005, Alex Michaels is deputy head of a new division of the FBI called "Netforce" which investigates computer crime and polices the Internet. When his boss and mentor, Steve Day, is assassinated, the evidence points to Web pioneer and owner of the company Januscorp, Will Stiles, a character said to be Bill Gates' apprentice. Stiles is about to release a new web browser that may allow him to hack into any computer in the world and to gain control of the Internet. Michaels is appointed acting Commander of Netforce, and leads his people on the hunt for Stiles.

Cast 
 Scott Bakula as Alex Michaels
 Kris Kristofferson as Steve Day 
 Judge Reinhold as Will Stiles
 Cary-Hiroyuki Tagawa as Leong Cheng
 Joanna Going as Toni Fiorelli
 Brian Dennehy as Lowell Davidson 
 CCH Pounder as FBI Director Sandra Knight
 Xander Berkeley as Bo Tyler
 Frank Vincent as Johnny Stompato

Production 
NetForce was shot in Los Angeles, Virginia, and Washington, DC.

Reception 
Bruce Fretts of Entertainment Weekly called it "boring cyber-nonsense". William McDonald of The New York Times wrote, "The movie does gather suspense and momentum in Part II, but so much is going on, and so much dialogue is devoted to explaining it, that no one has time to be interesting." Steve Johnson of the Chicago Tribune called it "pretty silly stuff".

References

Further reading

External links 
 

1999 television films
1999 films
1990s science fiction films
1990s thriller films
American television films
American thriller films
Techno-thriller films
Works about computer hacking
Tom Clancy's Net Force
Films based on works by Tom Clancy
Films based on American novels
Films based on military novels
Films directed by Robert Lieberman
Films scored by Jeff Rona
Films set in 2005
Films shot in Los Angeles
Films shot in Virginia
Films shot in Washington, D.C.
Trimark Pictures films
1990s American films